The 1954 Oregon Webfoots baseball team represented the University of Oregon in the 1954 NCAA baseball season. The Webfoots played their home games at Howe Field. The team was coached by Don Kirsch in his 7th year at Oregon.

The Webfoots won the District VII Playoff to advanced to the College World Series, where they were defeated by the UMass Minutemen.

Roster

Schedule 

! style="" | Regular Season
|- valign="top" 

|- align="center" bgcolor="#ccffcc"
| 1 ||  ||  || Howe Field • Eugene, Oregon || 5–3 || 1–0 || –
|- align="center" bgcolor="#ffcccc"
| 2 ||  || vs  || Unknown • Unknown || 2–7 || 1–1 || –
|- align="center" bgcolor="#ccffcc"
| 3 ||  || vs Lewis–Clark || Unknown • Unknown || 10–2 || 2–1 || –
|- align="center" bgcolor="#ccffcc"
| 4 ||  || vs  || Unknown • Unknown || 8–7 || 3–1 || –
|- align="center" bgcolor="#ccffcc"
| 5 ||  || vs  || Unknown • Unknown || 5–3 || 4–1 || –
|- align="center" bgcolor="#ccffcc"
| 6 ||  ||  || Howe Field • Eugene, Oregon || 10–1 || 5–1 || 1–0
|- align="center" bgcolor="#ffcccc"
| 7 ||  || Washington State || Howe Field • Eugene, Oregon || 8–11 || 5–2 || 1–1
|- align="center" bgcolor="#ccffcc"
|  ||  || at Washington State || Bailey Field • Pullman, Washington || 5–4 || – || –
|- align="center" bgcolor="#ffcccc"
|  ||  || at Washington State || Bailey Field • Pullman, Washington || 3–5 || – || –
|- align="center" bgcolor="#ccffcc"
|  ||  ||  || Howe Field • Eugene, Oregon || 7–2 || – || –
|- align="center" bgcolor="#ccffcc"
|  ||  || Idaho || Howe Field • Eugene, Oregon || 4–1 || – || –
|- align="center" bgcolor="#ccffcc"
|  ||  || at Idaho || MacLean Field • Moscow, Idaho || 13–4 || – || –
|- align="center" bgcolor="#ccffcc"
|  ||  || at Idaho || MacLean Field • Moscow, Idaho || 8–4 || – || –
|- align="center" bgcolor="#ffcccc"
|  ||  ||  || Howe Field • Eugene, Oregon || 2–18 || – || –
|- align="center" bgcolor="#ccffcc"
|  ||  || Washington || Howe Field • Eugene, Oregon || 3–1 || – || –
|- align="center" bgcolor="#ccffcc"
|  ||  || at Washington || Old Graves Field • Seattle, Washington || 4–3 || – || –
|- align="center" bgcolor="#ffcccc"
|  ||  || at Washington || Old Graves Field • Seattle, Washington || 7–9 || – || –
|- align="center" bgcolor="#ccffcc"
| 18 ||  || at Oregon State || Coleman Field • Corvallis, Oregon || 9–7 || 14–5 || 9–4
|- align="center" bgcolor="#ffcccc"
| 19 ||  || Oregon State || Howe Field • Eugene, Oregon || 3–7 || 14–6 || 9–5
|- align="center" bgcolor="#ccffcc"
| 20 ||  || at Oregon State || Coleman Field • Corvallis, Oregon || 12–6 || 15–6 || 10–5
|- align="center" bgcolor="#ccffcc"
| 21 ||  || Oregon State || Howe Field • Eugene, Oregon || 4–0 || 16–6 || 11–5
|-

|-
! style="" | Postseason
|- 

|- align="center" bgcolor="#ccffcc"
| 22 ||  || Seattle || Howe Field • Eugene, Oregon || 9–4 || 16–6 || 11–5
|- align="center" bgcolor="#ccffcc"
| 23 ||  ||  || Howe Field • Eugene, Oregon || 9–5 || 17–6 || 11–5
|- align="center" bgcolor="#ccffcc"
| 24 ||  || Fresno State || Howe Field • Eugene, Oregon || 1–0 || 18–6 || 11–5
|-

|- align="center" bgcolor="#ffcccc"
| 25 || June 10 || vs Arizona || Omaha Municipal Stadium • Omaha, Nebraska || 1–12 || 18–7 || 11–5
|- align="center" bgcolor="#ffcccc"
| 26 || June 11 || vs  || Johnny Rosenblatt Stadium • Omaha, Nebraska || 8–3 || 18–8 || 11–5
|-

Awards and honors 
Norm Forbes
 First Team All-District VIII
 All-North Division

John Keller
 All-North Division

Neal Marlett
 First Team All-District VIII
 All-North Division

George Shaw
 First Team All-American
 First Team All-District VIII
 All-North Division

Pete Williams
 All-North Division

References 

Oregon Ducks baseball seasons
Oregon Ducks baseball
College World Series seasons
Oregon
Pac-12 Conference baseball champion seasons